The Metropolitan New York Library Council (METRO) is a non-profit organization that specializes in providing research, programming, and organizational tools for libraries, archives, and museums in the New York metropolitan area. The council was founded in 1964 under the Education Law of the State of New York.

Member institutions include the Brooklyn Public Library, City University of New York Libraries, Columbia University, Memorial Sloan-Kettering Cancer Center, Mercy College, Museum of Modern Art, New York Botanical Garden, New York Public Library, New York University, Queens Public Library, Rockefeller University, Westchester Library System, Sotheby's Institute of Art, Scholastic, Inc., and UNICEF.

Overview
As a membership-based organization, METRO offers archival and library training opportunities, facilitates research and local community initiatives, supports Special Interest Groups (SIGs), and provides research, programming, and organizational tools for New York libraries, archives, and museums. It is also responsible for providing funding for internships and digitization projects to member libraries. METRO digitization grants provide member libraries with the opportunity to digitize their collections, several of which are available via the Internet Archive in METRO's collection of ebooks and texts.

Programs and sponsored projects
 Digitization Grant Program
 myMETRO Researchers
 Documentary Heritage Program (DHP) The current Documentary Heritage Program is collocated on its Keeping Collections website.
 Hospital Library Services Program
 Queens Memory Project
 NYARC Documenting the Gilded Age: New York City Exhibitions at the Turn of the Century
 Wikipedia GLAM Initiative ("Galleries, Libraries, Archives, and Museums") via Metropolitan New York Library Council

Works or publications
 "Hurricane Sandy: Record, Remember, Rebuild"

See also
 List of Library Associations
 List of Library Associations specific to American states

References

External links
 

Non-profit organizations based in New York City
Library consortia in New York (state)